Richard Francis Xavier Manning, known as Brennan Manning (April 27, 1934 – April 12, 2013) was an American author, laicized priest, and public speaker. He is best known for his bestselling book The Ragamuffin Gospel.

Biography
Born and raised in Depression-era New York City, Manning finished high school, enlisted in the US Marine Corps, and fought in the Korean War.  After returning to the United States, he enrolled at Saint Francis University in Loretto, Pennsylvania. Upon his graduation from the seminary in 1963, Manning was ordained a Franciscan priest.

In the late 1960s, Manning joined the Little Brothers of Jesus of Charles de Foucauld, a religious institute committed to an uncloistered, contemplative life among the poor. Manning transported water via donkey, worked as a mason's assistant and a dishwasher in France, was imprisoned (by choice) in Switzerland, and spent six months in a remote cave in the Zaragoza desert. In the 1970s, Manning returned to the United States and began writing after confronting his alcoholism.

The following quote appeared in the prelude to dc Talk's song "What if I Stumble?" It also appeared on an intro track for the Christian metalcore band War of Ages on its album Fire From the Tomb:

Bibliography
 Gentle Revolutionaries, 1970
 Souvenirs of Solitude, 1979
 Stranger to Self-Hatred, 1981
 Parable of William Juan, 1985
 Prophets & Lovers: In Search of the Holy Spirit, 1985
 Lion and Lamb/the Relentless Tenderness of Jesus, 1986
 The Signature of Jesus, 1988
 .
 Abba's Child: The Cry of the Heart for Intimate Belonging, 1994 (NavPress)
 The Signature of Jesus, 1996
 The Boy Who Cried Abba: A Parable of Trust and Acceptance, 1996
 Reflections for Ragamuffins: Daily Devotions from the Writings of Brennan Manning, 1998
 Ruthless Trust: The Ragamuffin's Path to God, 2001
 Rich Mullins: An Arrow Pointing to Heaven, 2001 (foreword only)
 
 The Journey of the Prodigal: A Parable of Sin and Redemption, 2002 (b)
 A Glimpse of Jesus: The Stranger to Self-Hatred, 2003
 Posers, Fakers, and Wannabes: Unmasking the Real You, 2003
 The Importance of Being Foolish: How to think like Jesus 2006
 The Furious Longing of God, 2009
 Souvenirs of Solitude: Finding Rest in Abba's Embrace, 2009 (2nd Ed, NavPress)
 Patched Together: A Story of My Story, 2010
 All Is Grace: A Ragamuffin Memoir, 2011

Filmography
 Ragamuffin, 2014 (portrayed by Charles Lawlor)
 Brennan, 2016

References

External links

 
 
 

1934 births
Writers from New York City
2013 deaths
United States Marines
Laicized Roman Catholic priests
American Roman Catholics
American spiritual writers
Saint Francis University alumni